Kelvin Tiller (born June 26, 1990) is an American mixed martial artist currently competing in the light heavyweight division. A professional competitor since 2011, Tiller has also formerly competed for Bellator, World Series of Fighting and Shark Fights.

Background
Born and raised in Kansas, Tiller was often involved in street fights while growing up and also briefly trained in boxing and karate. Tiller later attended Highland Park High School where he competed in track and won a city championship for the 100-meter dash in his senior year.

Mixed martial arts career

Early career
Tiller competed as an amateur from 2009 until 2011, compiling a record of 7–3. On September 10, 2011, Tiller made his professional MMA debut against Jeb Chiles at Shark Fights 19. Tiller won the fight by submission at the end of the first round.

Bellator
Tiller made his Bellator debut on October 29, 2011, at Bellator 56 against Daniel Spohn. Tiller defeated Spohn via split decision.

In his next appearance for Bellator, Tiller faced Jeremiah Riggs at Bellator 70 on May 25, 2012. Tiller won the fight by submission in the third round.

Tiller then stepped in as a replacement for an injured Marcus "Lelo" Aurelio and defeated Amaechi Oselukwue via second-round TKO at Bellator 73 on August 24, 2012.

Tiller was expected to face Dave Vitkay at Bellator 88 on February 7, 2013. However, when Tiller failed to make weight for the third consecutive time, the bout was cancelled and Tiller was subsequently released from his Bellator contract.

Post-Bellator
After parting ways with Bellator, Tiller faced Chris Henning on June 29, 2013, at Epic Fight Night 1: Stinson vs. Kimmons. Tiller won via submission in round one.

World Series of Fighting
In November 2013, Tiller signed a multi-fight deal with World Series of Fighting.

Tiller was scheduled to face Ronny Markes at WSOF 12 on August 9, 2014, but when Krasimir Mladenov pulled out of his fight with Elvis Mutapčić due to injury on the same card, Tiller stepped in as a replacement. As a result, Markes ended up fighting promotional newcomer Cully Butterfield. Tiller was handed his first professional defeat by Mutapcic via three-round unanimous decision.

Return to Bellator
Tiller, as a replacement for Steve Mowry, was scheduled to face Marcelo Golm on August 20, 2021, at Bellator 265. The week of the event, Tiller had to pull out of the bout due to undisclosed reasons.

Personal life

Tiller went to Topeka High high school and Highland Park High in Topeka, Ks after high school he went to Allen County Community College for track. He was raised by a single mother Patricia Rains as they moves around between Kansas City and Topeka most of his childhood. He is the youngest of 4 children and has 3 older sisters Patricia (Nikki) Tiller, Tierra Tiller, and Autumn Tiller. He has always been a family oriented man with his Grandmother ( Ellenor Irons) Grandfather (Harrison Irons Sr.) and Uncle  (Harrison (Dunnie) Irons Jr.) helping with his up bringing . Tiller himself has 3 sons and 4 daughters having his first child at the age of 16. While growing up on the streets of Topeka he had to grow up fast so fighting became natural for him. His mission in life is to make sure his family is taken care of. On October 4, 2018, Tiller lost a major factor in his life, the man that thought him everything in life his grandfather Harrison Irons Sr. the day before his October 5 fight for PFL. Tiller is a major influencer in his community. He mentors the young kids, telling them that there is more out there in life; and that you can be what ever you want to be in life as long as you put your all into it.

Mixed martial arts record

|-
|Win
|align=center|12–5
|Rudy Schaffroth
|KO (knee)
|Tuff-N-Uff 129
|
|align=center|3
|align=center|0:39
|Las Vegas, Nevada, United States
|
|-
|Loss
|align=center|11–5
|Jared Rosholt
|Decision (unanimous)
|rowspan=2 | PFL 9
|rowspan=2 | 
|align=center| 3
|align=center| 5:00
|rowspan=2 | Las Vegas, Nevada, United States
|
|-
|Loss
|align=center|11–4
|Ali Isaev
|Decision (unanimous)
|align=center|2
|align=center|5:00
|
|-
|Loss
|align=center|11–3
|Denis Goltsov
|Submission (ezekiel choke)
|PFL 6
|
|align=center| 2
|align=center| 3:40
|Atlantic City, New Jersey, United States
|
|-
|Win
|align=center|11–2
|Muhammed Dereese
|Submission (kimura)
|PFL 3
|
|align=center| 1
|align=center| 3:22
|Uniondale, New York, United States
|
|-
|Loss
|align=center|10–2
|Jared Rosholt
|Decision (unanimous)
|PFL 8
|
|align=center|2
|align=center|5:00
|New Orleans, Louisiana, United States
|
|-
|Win
|align=center|10–1
|Jared Rosholt
|Submission (guillotine choke)
|PFL 4
|
|align=center| 2
|align=center| 0:54
|Uniondale, New York, United States
| 
|-
| Win
| align=center| 9–1
|Caio Alencar
|KO (punch)
| PFL 1
|
|align=center|1
|align=center|4:34
|New York City, New York, United States
| 
|-
| Win
| align=center| 8–1
|Kevin Ray Sears
|TKO (punches)
| Shamrock FC 282
|
|align=center|1
|align=center|2:17
|Kansas City, Missouri, United States
|Heavyweight debut.
|-
| Win
| align=center| 7–1
| Marcus Sursa
| Submission (rear-naked choke)
| Shamrock FC: Heavy Artillery
| 
| align=center| 2
| align=center| 2:57
| Kansas City, Missouri, United States
| 
|-
| Loss
| align=center| 6–1
| Elvis Mutapčić
| Decision (unanimous)
| WSOF 12
| 
| align=center| 3
| align=center| 5:00
| Las Vegas, Nevada, United States
| 
|-
| Win
| align=center| 6–0
| Chris Henning
| Submission (rear-naked choke)
| Epic Fight Night 1: Stinson vs. Kimmons
| 
| align=center| 1
| align=center| 4:57
| Kansas City, Missouri, United States
| 
|-
| Win
| align=center| 5–0
| Amaechi Oselukwue
| TKO (punches)
| Bellator 73
| 
| align=center| 2
| align=center| 4:21
| Tunica Resorts, Mississippi, United States
| 
|-
| Win
| align=center| 4–0
| Jeremiah Riggs
| Technical Submission (kimura)
| Bellator 70
| 
| align=center| 3
| align=center| 3:38
| New Orleans, Louisiana, United States
| 
|-
| Win
| align=center| 3–0
| Jake Collier
| Submission (triangle choke)
| Fight Me MMA
| 
| align=center| 1
| align=center| 4:40
| St. Charles, Missouri, United States
| 
|-
| Win
| align=center| 2–0
| Daniel Spohn
| Decision (split)
| Bellator 56
| 
| align=center| 3
| align=center| 5:00
| Kansas City, Kansas, United States
|Light Heavyweight debut.
|-
| Win
| align=center| 1–0
| Jeb Chiles
| Submission (armbar)
| Shark Fights 19
| 
| align=center| 1
| align=center| 4:14
| Independence, Missouri, United States
|

References

Living people
American male mixed martial artists
Light heavyweight mixed martial artists
Mixed martial artists utilizing karate
Mixed martial artists utilizing boxing
American male karateka
1990 births